René Schöfisch (born 3 February 1962) is a German speed skater who competed for East Germany in the 1984 Winter Olympics.

He was born in East Berlin. He won bronze medals in the 5000 metres and 10000 metres at the 1984 Winter Olympics in Sarajevo.

References

1962 births
Living people
German male speed skaters
Olympic speed skaters of East Germany
Speed skaters at the 1984 Winter Olympics
Olympic bronze medalists for East Germany
Olympic medalists in speed skating
Medalists at the 1984 Winter Olympics
German roller skaters
20th-century German people